Roman Bilinski (born 4 March 2004) is a Polish-British racing driver. He currently competes in the Formula Regional European Championship with Trident, having previously raced in the F4 British Championship and won races in the GB3 Championship.

Career

Ginetta Junior Championship 
Bilinski's racing career started in 2018, when he raced in the Winter Series of the Ginetta Junior Championship. He then competed in the first seven rounds of the 2019 season with Alastair Rushforth Motorsport. His first victory and pole position would come at the first race at Donington Park.

F4 British Championship 
In 2020 Bilinski made his single-seater debut in the F4 British Championship, partnering Alex Connor and Frederick Lubin at the TRS Arden Junior Team. His first podium came at Oulton Park.

The Pole went on to finish two more races in third position and finished eighth in the championship at the end of the year.

For the 2021 campaign Bilinski switched to Carlin to race alongside Kai Askey, Tasanapol Inthraphuvasak and Dougie Bolger. Bilinski only did a part season in the British F4 Championship, Bilinski scored his first podium finish of the season at Oulton Park in race 3.

GB3 Championship 
Bilinski moved into the GB3 Championship to replace Frederick Lubin, who had fallen ill, at Arden International. The Pole experienced a very strong debut weekend, with three finishes in the top five with only 1 day of testing. His next weekend would be even more successful: after finishing third in the first race, Bilinski became the first Polish driver to win a race in British F3. Snetterton was up next, and there Bilinski showed blistering pace, finishing third in the first and second race, and then won race 3 on Sunday, becoming the only driver to score a podium at every race on the same weekend that year.  The Pole won another race at Oulton Park and ended his season in seventh in the standings, beating both of his teammates with only a part season.

Formula Regional European Championship

2022 

For 2022, Bilinski moved up to the Formula Regional European Championship for the 2022 season with Trident.

2023 
Bilinski was retained by Trident for the 2023 season.

Racing record

Racing career summary 

* Season still in progress.

Complete F4 British Championship results 
(key) (Races in bold indicate pole position) (Races in italics indicate fastest lap)

Complete GB3 Championship results 
(key) (Races in bold indicate pole position) (Races in italics indicate fastest lap)

Complete Formula Regional European Championship results 
(key) (Races in bold indicate pole position) (Races in italics indicate fastest lap)

* Season still in progress.

References

External links 
 
 

Living people
British people of Polish descent
Polish racing drivers
British F4 Championship drivers
2004 births
Ginetta Junior Championship drivers
Arden International drivers
Carlin racing drivers
British racing drivers
BRDC British Formula 3 Championship drivers
Formula Regional European Championship drivers
Trident Racing drivers